Abiral Ghimire (Nepali:अबिरल घिमिरे, born 9 September 1999) also known as Abiral Himalayan Cheetah (アビラル・ヒマラヤンチーター) is a Nepalese kickboxer, currently fighting in the super-welterweight division of K-1. A professional competitor since 2017, he is the current HEAT Middleweight champion.

Background
Abhiral Ghimire is originally from Gurjudhara in the Chandragiri Municipality. He went to Japan in 2016 and started kickboxing inspired by his father who also was a kick boxer and participated in "K-1 WORLD GP 2004 in SEOUL" held in Korea in 2004 under the name of Dave Kumar Ghimire. He also fought Minowaman in 2011 at "GLADIATOR 27" under mixed martial arts rules. Abiral's ring name "Himalayan Cheetah" is said to have come from his father's desire to "become a fighter who beats his opponent ferociously like a cheetah."

Kickboxing career

Early career
Ghimire made his professional debut against Negi Majin at HEAT 41 on December 23, 2017. He won the fight by a first-round knockout.

Ghimire extended his winning streak to three fights with a stoppage victory against Lada at S.BATTLE 15 on April 15, 2018 and a decision victory against Pan Soo Kim at HEAT 42 on May 27, 2018. These victories earned Ghimire a place in the HEAT 43 Middleweight tournament, held on September 17, 2018. He beat Yohei Fujioka by a first-round technical knockout, but lost to Bruno Gazani by unanimous decision in the finals.

HEAT Middleweight champion

Title run
Ghimire was scheduled to face Kyung Jae Cho at HEAT 44 on March 2, 2019. He won the fight by a second-round knockout.

Ghimire was scheduled to face Franco Gutierrez at HEAT 45 on July 28, 2019. He won the fight by a second-round knockout.

Ghimire was scheduled to fight Akihi Aoya at S.BATTLE on November 3, 2019. He won the fight by a first-round technical knockout.

Title reign
His three-fight winning streak earned Ghimire the chance to fight Ichiyo Morimoto at HEAT 46 on January 19, 2020, for the HEAT Middleweight title. HE won the title by a first-round knockout, landing a right hook at the 2:20 minute mark.

Ghimire was scheduled to make his first title defense eight months later, against Tatsuya at HEAT 47 on September 13, 2020. He successfully defended the title by a first-round knockout, stopping his opponent with a left knee midway through the round.

K-1
Ghimire was scheduled to fight the reigning super-welterweight K-1 champion Minoru Kimura in a non-title bout at K-1 World GP 2020 in Tokyo on December 13, 2020. He lost the fight by a second-round technical knockout, after the ringside doctor stopped the fight due to a cut above Abiral's left eye.

Ghimire was scheduled to fight Kotetsu at K-1 World GP 2021: K’Festa 4 Day.2 on March 28, 2021. He won the fight by a first-round knockout.

Ghimire made his return to HEAT against Eiji Yoshida at HEAT 48 on April 25, 2021. He won the fight by a first-round technical knockout.

Ghimire was scheduled to face Hiromi Wajima at K-1 World GP 2021 in Fukuoka on Juy 17, 2021. He lost the fight by a third-round low kick knockout.

Ghimire was scheduled to fight Daisuke Fujimura for the HEAT Kick -70kg title at HEAT 49 on October 17, 2021. He won the fight by a first-round technical knockout.

Ghimire was scheduled to face Daiki Matsushita at K-1 World GP 2022 Japan on February 27, 2022. He won the fight by a first-round technical knockout, stopping Matsushita with a flurry of punches at the 2:00 minute mark of the opening round.

Ghimire was booked to face Raseasing Weerasakreck in a non-title bout at HEAT 50 on May 7, 2022. He won the fight by knockout in the first round with a body shot.

Ghimire faced the four-weight Rajadamnern Stadium champion Jomthong Chuwattana at K-1 World GP 2022 Yokohamatsuri on September 11, 2022. He lost the fight by a first-round head kick knockout.

Ghimire faced the Krush Super Welterweight champion Jordann Pikeur at K-1 World GP 2023: K'Festa 6 on March 12, 2023. He lost the fight by a third-round knockout.

Championships and awards
 HEAT
 2020 HEAT Kick Middleweight Championship (Two title defenses)

Kickboxing record

|-  style="background:#fbb;"
| 2023-03-12 || Loss ||align=left| Jordann Pikeur || K-1 World GP 2023: K'Festa 6 || Tokyo, Japan || KO (Left hook) || 3 || 0:06 ||14–5
|-
|-  style="text-align:center; background:#fbb;"
| 2022-09-11 || Loss || align=left| Jomthong Chuwattana ||  K-1 World GP 2022 Yokohamatsuri  || Yokohama, Japan || KO (High kick) ||  1 || 3:02 ||14–4
|-
|- style="background:#cfc;"
| 2022-05-07 || Win || align="left" | Raseasing Weerasakreck || HEAT 50 || Nagoya, Japan|| KO (Left hook to the body) || 1 || 2:54 ||14–3
|-
|- style="background:#cfc"
| 2022-02-27||Win ||align=left| Daiki Matsushita ||  K-1 World GP 2022 Japan || Tokyo, Japan || TKO (Punches)  || 1 || 2:00 || 13–3
|-
|- style="background:#cfc;"
| 2021-10-17 || Win || align="left" | Daisuke Fujimura || HEAT 49 ||Nagoya, Japan|| TKO (Doctor Stoppage) || 1|| 0:57 ||12–3 
|-
! style=background:white colspan=9 |
|-  style="background:#fbb;"
| 2021-07-17|| Loss ||align=left| Hiromi Wajima|| K-1 World GP 2021 in Fukuoka || Fukuoka, Japan || KO (Low Kicks) || 3 || 2:23  ||11–3
|- style="background:#cfc;"
| 2021-04-25 || Win || align="left" | Eiji Yoshida || HEAT 48 ||Nagoya, Japan|| TKO (3 Knockdowns/Punches) || 1 || 1:24 ||11–2
|-  style="background:#cfc;"
| 2021-03-28|| Win  ||align=left| Kotetsu || K-1 World GP 2021: K’Festa 4 Day.2 || Tokyo, Japan || KO (Punches & Knee) || 1 || 2:21 ||10–2
|-  style="background:#fbb;"
| 2020-12-13|| Loss ||align=left| Minoru Kimura || K-1 World GP 2020 in Tokyo || Tokyo, Japan || TKO (Doctor Stoppage)|| 2|| 2:50 || 9–2
|- style="background:#cfc;"
| 2020-09-13 ||Win|| align="left" | Tatsuya || HEAT 47 ||Nagoya, Japan||KO (Left Knee)||1||1:44 || 9–1
|-
! style=background:white colspan=9 |
|- style="background:#cfc;"
| 2020-01-19 ||Win|| align="left" | Ichiyo Morimoto || HEAT 46 ||Nagoya, Japan||KO (Right hook)||1||2:20 ||8–1
|-
! style=background:white colspan=9 |
|- style="background:#cfc;"
| 2019-11-03 ||Win|| align="left" | Akihi Aoya|| S.BATTLE ||Okazaki, Japan|| TKO ||1|| 1:59||7–1
|- style="background:#cfc;"
| 2019-07-28 ||Win|| align="left" | Franco Gutierrez || HEAT 45 ||Nagoya, Japan||KO (3 Knockdown)||2||2:58 || 6–1
|- style="background:#cfc;"
| 2019-03-02 ||Win|| align="left" | Kyung Jae Cho || HEAT 44 ||Nagoya, Japan||KO (Knees & Punches)||2||1:29 || 5–1
|- style="background:#fbb;"
| 2018-09-17 ||Loss|| align="left" | Bruno Gazani || HEAT 43, Final ||Nagoya, Japan||Decision (Unanimous)||3||3:00 ||4–1
|- style="background:#cfc;"
| 2018-09-17 ||Win|| align="left" | Yohei Fujioka || HEAT 43, Semi Final ||Nagoya, Japan||TKO (2 Knockdown)||1||2:53 ||4–0
|- style="background:#cfc;"
| 2018-05-27 ||Win|| align="left" | Pan Soo Kim || HEAT 42 ||Nagoya, Japan||Decision (Unanimous)||3||3:00 || 3–0
|- style="background:#cfc;"
| 2018-04-15 ||Win|| align="left" | Lada || S.BATTLE 15  ||Okazaki, Japan||Ext.R TKO (Towel) ||4|| || 2–0
|- style="background:#cfc;"
| 2017-12-23 ||Win|| align="left" | Negi Majin || HEAT 41 ||Nagoya, Japan|| KO (Punch) ||1|| 1:11 || 1–0
|-
| colspan=9 | Legend:

See also
List of male kickboxers

References

1999 births
Living people
Nepalese kickboxers
Welterweight kickboxers
Sportspeople from Kathmandu
Khas people